William Jackson may refer to:

Arts and entertainment
William Jackson (organist born 1730) (1730–1803), referred to as Jackson of Exeter, English organist and composer
William Jackson of Masham (1815–1866), English organist and composer
William Henry Jackson (1843–1942), early photographer of the American West
William Jackson (Scottish composer) (born 1955), Scottish composer
William F. Jackson, American painter and art curator

Military
William Jackson (pirate) (fl. 1639–1645), British pirate
William Lowther Jackson (1825–1890), Confederate general
William Hicks Jackson (1835–1903), Confederate general from Tennessee
William Payne Jackson (1868–1945), U.S. Army general
William Jackson (Australian soldier) (1897–1959), Australian recipient of the Victoria Cross
Sir William Jackson (British Army officer) (1917–1999), British general, Governor of Gibraltar, military historian, and author
William Francis Jackson, British Army officer

Politics and law

U.K.
William Jackson (fl. 1601–1604), MP for Guildford and Haslemere
Sir William Jackson, 1st Baronet (1805–1876), British MP for Newcastle-under-Lyme and Derbyshire North
William Jackson, 1st Baron Allerton (1840–1917), English politician, Member of Parliament for Leeds
William Jackson, 1st Baron Jackson (1893–1954), Member of Parliament for Brecon and Radnorshire, 1939–1945

U.S.
William Jackson (secretary) (1759–1828), Secretary to the Philadelphia Convention and member of the U.S. Continental Army
William Jackson (Massachusetts politician, born 1783) (1783–1855), US Congressman from Massachusetts
William Terry Jackson (1794–1882), U.S. Representative from New York
William Jackson (Saugus, Massachusetts), English-American pottery manufacturer and politician of the 1820s
William A. Jackson, Black dispatches spy during the American Civil War
William Humphreys Jackson (1839–1915), congressman from Maryland
William Purnell Jackson (1868–1939), member of the United States Senate from Maryland
William S. Jackson (died 1932), New York State Attorney General, 1907–1908
William T. Jackson (Ohio politician) (1876–1933), mayor of Toledo, Ohio
William Harding Jackson (1901–1971), United States National Security Advisor
William M. Jackson (judge) (born 1953), associate judge on the Superior Court of the District of Columbia

Other political figures
William Jackson (New Zealand politician) (1832–1889), New Zealand politician
William Jackson (Canadian politician) (1858–1938), Canadian Member of Parliament
William Jackson (Canadian administrator)

Religion
William Jackson (journalist) (1737–1795), Irish preacher, journalist, playwright, radical, and spy
William Jackson (bishop) (1751–1815), bishop of Oxford
William Jackson (Archdeacon of Carlisle) (1792–1873), priest and academic
William Jackson (Dean of Killala) (died 1885), Anglican priest in Ireland
William Walrond Jackson (1811–1895), Bishop of Antigua, 1860–1879
William Jackson (Archdeacon of Killala) (died 1903)
William Jackson (priest) (1838–1931), Rector of Exeter College, Oxford
Ernest Jackson (priest) (William Ernest Jackson), 20th century Canadian Anglican priest
William Henry Jackson (priest) (1889–1931), Anglican priest, missionary, and inventor of Burmese Braille

Science and medicine
William Jackson (engineer) (1848–1910), Boston, Massachusetts city engineer, 1885–1910
William Jackson (inventor) (1849–1915), Scottish mechanical engineer
William M. Jackson (chemist) (born 1936), researcher
William Elvin Jackson, aviation electronics engineer

Sports
William Jackson (curler) (1871–1955), Scottish winner of the first Olympic gold medal in curling, Chamonix, 1924
William Jackson (footballer) (1876–1954), Newton Heath F.C., Burnley F.C. and Wales international footballer
Bill Jackson (first baseman) (William Riley Jackson, 1881–1958), first baseman for the Chicago Whales
William Jackson (pitcher) (fl. 1890–1906), pitcher and outfielder for early minor leagues and Negro leagues
William Jackson III (born 1992), American football player

Others 
William Jackson (Boston loyalist) (1731–1810), American Revolutionary era loyalist
William Jackson (gangster) (1901–1961), loan shark, enforcer and murder victim
William Turrentine Jackson (1915–2000), American professor of history
William K. Jackson, architect and co-founder of KBJ Architects
William Jackson Food Group, a food manufacturer in the United Kingdom
William Perry Jackson (born 1955), American serial killer

See also
Bill Jackson (disambiguation)
Willie Jackson (disambiguation)
Will Jackson (disambiguation)